Betty Burch (3 January 1911 – 4 December 1993) was an American athlete. She competed in the women's javelin throw at the 1936 Summer Olympics.

References

1911 births
1993 deaths
Athletes (track and field) at the 1936 Summer Olympics
American female javelin throwers
Olympic track and field athletes of the United States
Sportspeople from Bangor, Maine
20th-century American women